Kananaskis, Alberta may refer to:

Kananaskis, Alberta (community), an unincorporated community on Highway 1A in the Municipal District of Bighorn No. 8
Kananaskis Country, a park system within the improvement district
Kananaskis Lakes, consisting of Lower Kananaskis Lake and Upper Kananaskis Lake
Kananaskis Improvement District (No. 5), an administrative district in the Alberta rockies
Kananaskis Range, a mountain range in Kananaskis Country
Kananaskis River, a mountain river in Kananaskis Country
Kananaskis Summit, a 2002 political leaders meeting, formally the 28th G8 summit
Kananaskis Village, Alberta, an unincorporated community on Highway 40 (Kananaskis Trail) in Kananaskis Country
Peter Lougheed Provincial Park, sometimes referred to as Kananaskis Provincial Park

See also
Kananascus, a genus of fungi